This is a list of finalists for the 2015 Archibald Prize for portraiture. As the images are copyrighted, an external link to an image has been listed where available (listed is Artist – Title).
	
Adam Alcorn –  Alice Fraser  
John Beard –  Bill  
Richard Bell –  Me  
Jason Benjamin –  I sat by the river. I waited by the road  
Filippa Buttitta – Judy Cassab ‒ portrait of an artist  
Mitch Cairns –  Peter Powditch  
Tom Carment –  Self-portrait at 60  
Wei Bin Chen –  The artist ‒ self-portrait no 6  
Peter Churcher –  The last portrait  
Samuel Rush Condon –  Jarratt  
Tony Costa – David Fairbairn 
Tony Curran –  Luke  
Blak Douglas – Smoke and mirrors (Uncle Max Eulo)
Marc Etherington – Del Kathryn Barton and Magic Dog  
Carla Fletcher – Jenny Kee 
Prudence Flint –  Baby 
Juan Ford –  A bungled clairvoyance of William Buckley or Ludwig Leichhardt's most intense moments (I can't decide which, you choose)  
Shaun Gladwell – Mark Donaldson VC (member of the avant-garde)  
Bruno Jean Grasswill – Michael Caton (Winner of the People's Choice Award 2015, Winner of the Packing Room Prize 2015) (Image)
Tim Gregory – Self-portrait as ancestors  
Leon Hall – Self-portrait  
Robert Hannaford – Robert Hannaford, self-portrait  
Tsering Hannaford – Objet démodé  
Sophia Hewson – Delivered  
Tanja Karl – Laurie 
Matthew Kentmann – Nigel Milsom, Sunday 3 May 2015  
Jeremy Kibel – The portrait of Doctor Dick Quan  
Jessica Le Clerc – Living inside of stories  
Kim Leutwyler – Start the riot  
Stewart MacFarlane – Cory Bernardi 
Angus McDonald – Romanticide ‒ portrait of Abbe May  
Kerry McInnis – Omar Musa, the poetry of unease  
Julian Meagher – Daniel Johns 
Nigel Milsom – Judo house pt 6 (the white bird)  portrait of Charles Waterstreet (Winner of the Archibald Prize 2015)
Guy Morgan – Louise Voigt, CEO Barnardos Australia (after retinal detachment) 
Alicia Mozqueira – Doug Hall  
Jason Phu – Lisa has a much more pleasant face than Glenn. She also doesn't sing horribly while playing a guitar or try to put her cat up a tree while I'm painting her. 
Rodney Pople – Frannie and Brett 
Leslie Rice – Hill End bacchanal (portrait of Luke Sciberras)  
Sally Ross – Eva  
Paul Ryan – Thirteen Noahs  
Andrew Sayers – Portrait of Tim Bonyhady  
Jiawei Shen – How to explain art with a white rabbit  
Kristin Tennyson – Bob Katter, federal MP  
Mirra Whale – Elizabeth  
Marcus Wills – El cabeceo  
Tianli Zu –  'Edmund, your Twomblys are behind you'

See also 
Previous year: List of Archibald Prize 2014 finalists
Next year: List of Archibald Prize 2016 finalists
List of Archibald Prize winners

References

External links
Archibald Prize 2015 finalists official website

2015
Archibald
Archibald
Archibald Prize 2015
Archibald Prize 2015
2015 awards in Australia
Archibald